Don't Go may refer to:

Film 
 Don't Go (2010 film), a Turkish film
 Don't Go (2018 film), an Irish film

Songs 
 "Don't Go" (En Vogue song), 1991
 "Don't Go" (Hothouse Flowers song), 1987
 "Don't Go" (Marlon Jackson song), 1987
 "Don't Go" (Pseudo Echo song), 1985
 "Don't Go" (Skrillex, Justin Bieber and Don Toliver song), 2021
 "Don't Go" (Wretch 32 song), 2011
 "Don't Go" (Yazoo song), 1982
 "Don't Go (Girls and Boys)", by Fefe Dobson, 2004
 "Don't Go", by Bring Me the Horizon from There Is a Hell Believe Me I've Seen It. There Is a Heaven Let's Keep It a Secret.
 "Don't Go", by Craig David from Following My Intuition
 "Don't Go", by Doro from Angels Never Die
 "Don't Go", by Embodyment from Songs for the Living
 "Don't Go", by Exo from XOXO
 "Don't Go", by F. R. David
 "Don't Go", by George Jones and Melba Montgomery from What's in Our Heart
 "Don't Go", by J. Holiday from Round 2
 "Don't Go", by JLS from JLS
 "Don't Go", by Judas Priest from Point of Entry
 "Don't Go", by Le Click
 "Don't Go", by Mad Caddies from Keep It Going
 "Don't Go", by Matthew Sweet from Girlfriend
 "Don't Go", by Pearl Jam from Ten
 "Don't Go", by Rae Morris from Unguarded
 "Don't Go", by Ramones from Pleasant Dreams
 "Don't Go", by Ugly Kid Joe from America's Least Wanted

See also 
 Please Don't Go (disambiguation)
 Don't Leave (disambiguation)